Fjällnäs Castle is a villa located at the foot of  Dundret in Gällivare Municipality, Norrbotten County, Sweden.
It was built  in Swiss style during  1888  by Carl Otto Bergman (1828-1901) who was involved in the local wood products industry and mining.  He was manager of Aktiebolaget Bodträskfors during the years 1860–1887. As head of the mining company,  Bergman had his office in the house. The villa and estate were bought in 1987 by Riksbyggen, which began a renovation and built up the surrounding area into smaller groups of houses.

See also
List of castles in Sweden

References

Castles in Sweden
 Buildings and structures in Norrbotten County